This is the timeline of the stelliferous era but also partly charts the primordial era, and charts more of the degenerate era of the heat death scenario.

The scale is  where  is the time since the Big Bang expressed in years.

Timeline

See also

 Big Bang
 Cyclic model
 Dyson's eternal intelligence
 Final anthropic principle
 Future of an expanding universe
 Graphical timeline from Big Bang to Heat Death. Timeline uses double-logarithmic scale.
 Graphical timeline of the Big Bang
 Graphical timeline of the universe. Timeline uses linear time.
 Heat death of the universe
 List of other end scenarios than Heat Death
 1 E19 s and more
 Second law of thermodynamics
 Ultimate fate of the Universe
 The Last Question, story by Isaac Asimov which considers the oncome of heat death in the universe and how it may be reversed.

Stelliferous Era
Astrophysics
Physical cosmology